Maud de Prendergast, Lady of Offaly (17 March 1242 – before 1273), was a Norman-Irish noblewoman, the first wife of Maurice FitzGerald, 3rd Lord of Offaly, Justiciar of Ireland, and the mother of his two daughters, Juliana FitzGerald and Amabel.  She married three times; Maurice FitzGerald, 3rd Lord of Offaly was her third husband.

Family 
Maud was born in Ireland on 17 March 1242, the daughter of Sir Gerald de Prendergast of Beauvoir (died 1251), and his second wife, Matilda, daughter of Richard Mor de Burgh and Egidia de Lacy.

Maud had an elder half-sister, Marie de Prendergast from her father's first marriage to Maud Walter. Marie was the wife of Sir John de Cogan by whom she had issue. Maud's paternal grandparents were Philip de Prendergast, Lord of Enniscorthy, Constable of Leinster, and Maud de Quincy, a granddaughter of Strongbow, through the latter's illegitimate daughter Basilie de Clare who married Robert de Quincy, Constable of Leinster.

Her great-grandfather, Maurice de Prendergast, Lord Prendergast had played a prominent part in the Cambro-Norman invasion of Ireland led by Strongbow, and was rewarded with much land in counties Wexford, Waterford, Tipperary, Mayo, Wicklow, and Cork.

Marriages and issue 
When she was a young child, Maud was married to, firstly David FitzMaurice, who died by 17 March 1249, which was her seventh birthday; her second husband was Maurice de Rochford with whom she had issue. Between 1258 and 28 October 1259, following Maurice de Rochford's death which occurred sometime before May 1258, she married her third and last husband, Maurice FitzGerald, 3rd Lord of Offaly, Justiciar of Ireland (1238–1286). He was the son of Maurice FitzGerald, 2nd Lord of Offaly and Juliana.

Together Maurice and Maud had two daughters:
 Juliana FitzMaurice (c.1263 Dublin, Ireland - 24 September 1300), married firstly Thomas de Clare, Lord of Thomond, by whom she had four children; she married secondly Nicholas Avenel; she married thirdly Adam de Cretynges.
 Amabel FitzMaurice, married, but was childless.

Maud died on an unknown date. In 1273, her husband Maurice married his second wife, Emmeline Longespee (1252–1291) but fathered no children by her.

Ancestry

References

Sources
 The Complete Peerage, Vol. VII, p. 200

1242 births
13th-century deaths
13th-century Irish women
FitzGerald dynasty
13th-century Irish people
People from County Offaly